St. Alphonsus Church (French: Église Saint-Alphonse) is a historic former church building at 2029 Constance Street in New Orleans, Louisiana. Completed in 1857, it is one of the few surviving national examples of a richly multi-colored church interior predating the 1870s, and a high quality example of ecclesiastical Italianate architecture. It was declared a National Historic Landmark in 1996 for its architectural significance. It is now home to the St. Alphonsus Art and Cultural Center.

Building
The former St. Alphonsus Church is located in New Orleans' Lower Garden District neighborhood, on the north side of Constance Street, between St. Andrew and Josephine Streets. It has a complex and richly-decorated symmetrical façade, with a central entrance area flanked by two square towers topped by crosses. The façade is ornamented with pilasters, corbelled brick panels, and niches in which statues are mounted. The interior is also richly ornamented and has a coved plaster ceiling which have been painted with artwork by Dominique Canova. Its stained glass windows are Bavarian in origin, coming from F. X. Zettler. The floors are covered in mosaic tile.

History 
Completed in 1857, St. Alphonsus served as a parish for the Irish Catholic community of the Lower Garden District section of the city. (Other churches nearby served the Francophone and Germanic Catholic communities, including St. Mary's Assumption Church, the church built across the street for the German Catholic community). As various parishes were merged later in history, St. Alphonsus was closed in 1979. 

In the 1980s it was taken over by a local community group and now serves a community center.

See also

List of National Historic Landmarks in Louisiana
National Register of Historic Places listings in Orleans Parish, Louisiana

References

Irish-American culture in Louisiana
National Historic Landmarks in Louisiana
Churches on the National Register of Historic Places in Louisiana
Roman Catholic churches in New Orleans
Roman Catholic churches completed in 1855
19th-century Roman Catholic church buildings in the United States
Redemptorist churches in the United States
1857 establishments in Louisiana
Religious organizations established in 1857
National Register of Historic Places in New Orleans
Organizations disestablished in 1979